Gore Mountain is a mountain located near the village of North Creek in Warren County, New York, of which its peak is the highest point. Gore is flanked to the north by South Mountain, and to the southwest by Height of Land Mountain. The mountain is the site of the popular Gore Mountain ski resort. The mountain is the site of the Gore Mountain Fire Observation Station which was built in 1918.

History
Gore mountain gets its name from the word "gore", a tract of land, typically triangular, characteristically arising from survey lines that do not close. The mountain remained unsurveyed during early settlement of the Adirondack Mountain region because it was considered valueless to early farmers and loggers. It was considered too high and steep for farming and horse drawn logging. It remained a "gore" and the name stuck as Gore Mountain.

Fire tower
In August 1909, the first fire lookout tower was an  wooden tower constructed by the Forest, Fish and Game Commission. In 1918, the Civilian Conservation Corps replaced it with a  Aermotor LS40 tower. In October 1919, a hurricane caused the tower to fall down, as well as the tower on Hadley Mountain. The tower was rebuilt and was opened for the 1920 fire lookout season. The fire tower ceased fire lookout operations at the end of the 1988 season, and was officially closed in early 1989. The tower still remains but is closed to the public and is used as a communications relay tower.

Watershed
Gore Mountain stands within the watershed of the Hudson River which drains into New York Harbor.  The south end of Gore Mtn. drains into Black Mountain Brook, thence into Chatiemac Brook, North Creek, and the Hudson River.  The southeast slopes of Gore Mtn. drains into Straight Brook, thence into North Creek.  The northeast slopes of Gore Mtn. drains into Roaring Brook, thence into North Creek.  The north west and west slopes of Gore Mtn. drain into the headwaters of the East Branch of the Sacandaga River, thence into Hudson River.

Garnet mining

Industrial garnet has been mined at the Barton garnet mine since 1878 when Henry Hudson Barton began mining garnet for use as sandpaper abrasives. The rock that contains these garnets, referred to as the Gore Mountain Garnet unit, is a garnet amphibolite.

See also 
 List of mountains in New York

References 

Mountains of Warren County, New York
Mountains of New York (state)
Mining communities in New York (state)
Mines in New York (state)